Patericon or paterikon, a short form for πατερικόν βιβλίον ("father's book", usually Lives of the Fathers in English), is a genre of Byzantine literature of religious character, which were collections of sayings of saints, martyrs and hierarchs, and tales about them. These texts also have their roots in early monasticism.

Among the earliest collections of this kind are the Αποφθέγματα των άγίων γερόντων (Apophthegmata of Saint Elders, also known as the Alphabetical Patericon, Apophthegmata Patrum, Sayings of the Fathers of the Desert (Sayings of the Desert Fathers) ), the Historia monachorum in Aegypto and Λαυσαϊχόν (Historia Lausiaca) by Palladius - of the 4th century. Various paterica also known in translations into a number of languages (Latin, Slavonic, Coptic, Armenian, etc.)

In Russian Orthodoxy this kind of literature is known from the early Slavic literature, first translations, then original texts created in various monasteries. The popular paterica in the Russian monastic scene included the Kievan Cave patericon, the patericon of Volokolamsk Monastery, and the patericon of Solovki Monastery. The Kievan Cave patericon dates back from the first half of the 13th century and it also includes tales about the history of the monastery and its first monks such as the correspondence between Bishop Simon of Vladimir-Suzdal and the cave monk Polikarp. The text is based on the paterica compiled in the centers of Eastern Orthodox Church and was preserved in three 15th-century redactions: Arsenian (1406), First Cassian (1460), and Second Cassian (1462).

Some paterica 
 Valaam Patericon, a paterikon of the Valaam Monastery 
 Romanian Patericon  
 Serbian Patericon  
 Scete Patericon, an early Slavonic translation of Apophthegmata Patrum
 Kievan Cave Patericon, a paterikon of the Kiev Cave Monastery (13th century), :uk:Патерик Києво-Печерський
 Volokolamsk Patericon' (16th century)

See also 
 Synaxarion
 Patristics
 Kiev Patericon reference to St. Mark of the Caves

References 

 

Byzantine literature
Non-fiction genres
Christian hagiography